The 2017-18 Japan Figure Skating Championships were held on December 20–24, 2017 at the Musashino Forest Sports Plaza in Tokyo. It was the 86th edition of the event. Medals were awarded in the disciplines of men's singles, ladies' singles, pair skating, and ice dance.

Results

Men 
Uno won his second consecutive national title.

Hanyu withdrew to continue recovering from an ankle injury he sustained in practice at the 2017 NHK Trophy.

Ladies 
Miyahara won the national title for the fourth year in a row.

Pairs

Ice dance

Japan Junior Figure Skating Championships 
The 2017–18 Junior Championships took place on November 24–26, 2017 at the Gunma Sports Complex in Maebashi, Gunma.

Men

Ladies

Pairs

Ice dance

International team selections 
The Japan Skating Federation selected skaters for international competitions in the second half of the 2017–18 season based on the results of the national championships as well as international ISU-sanctioned competitions.

Winter Olympics 
The 2018 Winter Olympics will be held on February 9-25, 2018 in Pyeongchang, South Korea. Yuzuru Hanyu was chosen to compete despite missing the national championships, by virtue of his status as reigning World and Olympic champion, and his first place in the ISU World Standings at the time of the championships.

World Championships 
The 2018 World Championships will be held on March 19-25, 2018 in Milan, Italy. Japan's entries were announced in late December 2017.

Four Continents Championships 
The 2018 Four Continents Championships will be held on January 22-28, 2018 in Taipei City, Chinese Taipei. Japan's entries were announced in late December 2017.

World Junior Championships 
Commonly referred to as "Junior Worlds", the 2018 World Junior Championships will take place on March 5-11, 2018 in Sofia, Bulgaria. Japan's entries were announced in late December 2017.

References

Citations

External links 
 Japan Skating Federation official results & data
 Starting order/results details
 Starting order/results details (Junior)

Japan Figure Skating Championships
Japan Championships
Figure Skating Championships